Chlorochroa is a genus of shield (stink) bugs in the family Pentatomidae, found in Europe and North America. There are over 20 described species in Chlorochroa.

Description
Adult Chlorochroa range in size from 8-19 mm long and are broadly oval in shape. They are green to brownish or almost black in colour, and have a pale red/yellow/whitish margin around the body excluding the head. For at least some species, colouration varies with latitude, being darker in the south and greener in the north. The scutellum is long and triangular, sometimes has three bumps along the base and usually the tip is paler than the rest. The forewing membrane is often translucent.

Nymphal Chlorochroa are mostly black except (as in adults) for a yellow/white margin around the body excluding the head.

Different species of Chlorochroa look very similar. They are distinguished mainly by the shape of the male genitalia and, to a lesser extent, by their distributions.

Diet 
Chlorochroa feed on a range of different plants including apple, cotton, grape, English holly, Himalayan blackberry, hawthorn, arborvitae, groudsel, clover, alfalfa and cocklebur.

Life cycle 
The life cycle consists of the three stages of egg, nymph and adult. There are five nymphal instars.

Species
 C. belfragii (Stål, 1872)
 C. congrua Uhler, 1876
 C. dismalia Thomas, 1983
 C. faceta (Say, 1825)
 C. granulosa (Uhler, 1872)
 Chlorochroa juniperina (Linnaeus, 1758)
 C. kanei Buxton & Thomas, 1983
 C. ligata (Say, 1832) (conchuela bug)
 C. lineata Thomas, 1983
 C. norlandi Buxton and Thomas, 1983
 C. opuntiae Esselbaugh, 1948
 C. osborni (Van Duzee, 1904)
 C. persimilis Horvath, 1908
 Chlorochroa pinicola (Mulsant & Rey, 1852)
 Chlorochroa reuteriana (Kirkaldy, 1909)
 C. rita (Van Duzee, 1934)
 C. rossiana Buxton & Thomas, 1983
 C. saucia (Say, 1832)
 C. sayi (Stål, 1872) (Say's stink bug)
 C. senilis (Say, 1832)
 C. uhleri (Stål, 1872) (Uhler's stink bug)
 C. viridicata (Walker, 1867)

References

Further reading

 
 Thomas J. Henry, Richard C. Froeschner. (1988). Catalog of the Heteroptera, True Bugs of Canada and the Continental United States. Brill Academic Publishers.

External links

 NCBI Taxonomy Browser, Chlorochroa

 

Pentatomidae genera
Pentatomini
Taxa named by Carl Stål